The women's 800 metres event at the 1987 Pan American Games was held in Indianapolis, United States on 15 and 16 August.

Medalists

Results

Heats

Final

References

Athletics at the 1987 Pan American Games
1987
Pan